Ebinabo Potts-Johnson (born 1988) was crowned as Most Beautiful Girl in Nigeria Universe 2007 and has represented her country in the Miss Universe 2007 competition in Mexico City, Mexico on 28 May. She now works as a model.

References
 

1988 births
Living people
Nigerian female models
Miss Universe 2007 contestants
Nigerian beauty pageant winners
Date of birth missing (living people)
Place of birth missing (living people)
21st-century Nigerian women